Slocock is an English surname. Notable people with the surname include:

Caroline Slocock, British civil servant and author, first female private secretary at 10 Downing Street
Lancelot Slocock (1886–1916), rugby union international who represented England

Surnames of English origin